is a 1993 Japanese science fiction anime film based on the novel of the same name by Yoshio Aramaki. It was released in the United States by Central Park Media.

Plot
Set in the dawning of the 25th century, the earth has undergone changes and technology improved in leaps and bounds, with humanity now colonizing Mars. However, unknown to humanity, there is an ancient race of aliens known as 'The Gods' which have been patiently waiting and watching humanity's progress. They take action and try to halt man's progress into space with extreme force. Although humanity has some very advanced weaponry at their disposal such as highly advanced aircraft, orbital fighters and gigantic desert battleships full of the most amazing array of weapons, will it be enough to stop them? The aliens have impressive weapons of their own, including an unstoppable stealth carrier. Humanity's hope rests on the shoulders of Captain Akuh and the crew of the Battleship Aoba. They are to carry out a top-secret mission against the aliens which, if successful, could mean the end to the war.

Cast

Japanese Cast
Hideyuki Tanaka as Captain Akuh
Isshin Chiba as Operator
Kouji Tsujitani as J. Dalton
Yumi Touma as Dr. Lee
Hiroko Emori as Lt. Darsa Keligan
Yuzuru Fujimoto as Admiral Mikawa
Shinya Ohtaki as Yutaka Todoroki
Ikuya Sawaki as Colonel Coleman
Masaru Satou as John Bruce
Hirohiko Kakegawa as Yamamoto
Sanshiro Nitta as P.O.
Omi Minami as Announcer
Michiko Neya as Yoko Dalton

English Cast
B.H. O'Neill as Captain Akuh
Cynthia DeMoss as Dr. Lee
Dale Oliverio as Takeshi Hijikata
David Stuart as J. Dalton
Michael William as Yutaka Todoroki
Sharon Becker as Lt. Darsa Keligan
Barry Chiate as Colonel Coleman
Bob Heitman as Admiral Mikawa

Notelist

References

External links
 
 

1993 anime films
1993 films
1990s science fiction films
Adventure anime and manga
Central Park Media
Japanese animated science fiction films
Magic Bus (studio)